Suaeda salina is a species of plant in the family Amaranthaceae. It is endemic to Namibia.  Its natural habitat is cold desert.

References

Flora of Namibia
salina
Least concern plants
Barilla plants
Taxonomy articles created by Polbot